Kang Da Ri Airport is an airport in Wonsan, Kangwon-do, North Korea.  It is immediately adjacent to the nearby Kang Da Ri Highway Strip.

Facilities 
The airfield has a single asphalt runway 04/22 measuring 1560 x 46 feet (475 x 14 m). It is sited across a river from the Kang Da Ri Highway strip, and recent satellite photos appear to show a bridge connecting the two under construction. The reported runway appears to be on substantial fill and possibly extends through a nearby hill and emerges on the other side.  The field is a few miles southwest of Wonsan Airport.

References 

Airports in North Korea
Kangwon Province (North Korea)
Wonsan